Insatiability is a speculative fiction novel by the Polish writer, dramatist, philosopher, painter and photographer, Stanisław Ignacy Witkiewicz (Witkacy). Nienasycenie was written in 1927 and was first published in 1930. It is Witkiewicz's third novel, considered by many  to be his best. The novel consists of two parts: Przebudzenie (Awakening) and Obłęd (The madness).

Summary
The novel takes place in the future, circa 2000. Following a battle, modeled after the Bolshevik revolution, Poland is overrun by the army of the last and final Mongol conquest. The nation becomes enslaved to the Chinese leader Murti Bing. His emissaries give everyone a special pill called DAVAMESK B 2 which takes away their abilities to think and to mentally resist. East and West become one, in faceless misery fueled by sexual instincts.

Witkiewicz's Insatiability combines chaotic action with deep philosophical and political discussion, and predicts many of the events and political outcomes of the subsequent years, specifically, the invasion of Poland, the postwar foreign domination as well as the totalitarian mind control exerted, first by the Germans, and then by the Soviet Union on Polish life and art.

Characters
 Genezip (Zip) Kapen – The protagonist of the story. Zip is nineteen and has recently graduated from school. The book opens with Zip contemplating the previous night's events, starting with his visit to the residence of Princess di Ticonderoga.
 Papa Kapen – Zip's father. They don't have a very strong relationship, but make peace on his deathbed, becoming friends of sorts. Zip's father is also the reason for his entry into the army, when he was lying in the hospital bed he wrote a letter to his friend, recommending Zip to be the general's aide.
 Princess Irina Vsevolodovna di Ticonderoga –
 Putricides Tenzer – A composer and friend of Princess di Ticonderoga. Tenzer specializes in atonal and unstructured music, and is also a brutal critic of art and philosophy. He is a hunchback and has a deformed leg because of a bone disease. He is married with two children, but is occasionally unfaithful and often flirts with the Princess. His wife is a mountain woman that he had married when he was young for some money and a chalet, though at the time he found her somewhat attractive as well. "To be born a hunchback in Poland is bad luck; to be born an artist in addition the worst luck of all."
 Sturfan Abnol – An ex-lover of the princess. Abnol is a novelist and eventually becomes romantically involved with Zip's sister.
 Prince Basil Ostrogski – Another ex-lover of the Princess. He is a beginner neo-Catholic.
 Afanasol Benz – An old friend of Prince Basil's. He used to be rich, but after he lost his estate in Russia he created his own form of logic, which no one other than him can understand.
 Toldzio – Zip's cousin.
 Erasmus Kotzmolochowicz – The legendary quartermaster general of the Polish Army. Kotzmolochowicz is seen by most of the world as the only force that could possibly stop the "mobile Chinese Wall" that looms over Europe. Very little is known about him, which is later found out to be intentional; he doesn't even allow portraits of himself so that he cannot be caricatured.

Influence and translation
Czesław Miłosz frames the first chapter of his book The Captive Mind around a discussion of Insatiability, specifically the "Murti-Bing pill," which allows artists to contentedly conform to the demands of the equivalent of Socialist Realism.

The novel was translated into English in 1977 by University of Toronto professor of Polish and Russian literature Louis Iribarne and published by Northwestern University Press.

References

External links 
 Full text of Nienasycenie in Polish. Part one: Przebudzenie. Part two: Obłęd. Cyfrowa Biblioteka Narodowa "Polona".

Polish novels
Polish science fiction novels
1927 science fiction novels
1930 science fiction novels
20th-century Polish novels
Alternate history novels
Dystopian novels
Fiction about mind control
Novels about substance abuse